Carol Pagaduan Araullo is a Filipino activist and is currently the Chairperson of Bagong Alyansang Makabayan (New Patriotic Alliance).

College education and early activism 
Araullo went into University of the Philippines Diliman as a psychology major. Active in extra-curriculars, she was elected councilor in the College of Arts and Sciences, and later as vice-chairperson of the University Student Council. She also joined the UP Student Catholic Action. During the Diliman Commune, she was studying for exam when she was called by a fellow student by realizing unto her that while the students are outside protesting, she is still studying. She participated in the said mass action but was initially critical of the violence coming from both the police and the protesters. But having witnessed the shooting of Pastor Mesina radicalized her, realizing that, "the State, the government, that has a monopoly on sanctioned violence."

She became a known youth leader during the resistance under the martial law era under then-dictator Ferdinand Marcos, Sr.. She graduated from University of the Philippines College of Medicine. She delivered the valedictory address at the 1975 UP commencement exercises after she was detained for two years. She also went and organized in the underground.

Post martial-law 
After martial law, she realized that even though the president changed, the system did not. While not practicing medicine formally, she was able to organize health practitioners among rural communities.

Araullo has been the Chairperson of Bagong Alyansang Makabayan since 2008. She has continuously spoken regarding various issues in the Philippines na beyond regarding human rights, economics, and sovereignty.

In October 2022, Araullo was red-tagged by social media trolls, claiming that she is a member of the New People's Army and responsible for the Mendiola Massacre. Her son, Atom, called out the red-tagging incident.

She writes an editorial in BusinessWorld, titled "Streetwise."

Personal life 
He husband is Miguel Araullo, an engineer. She is the mother of journalist and TV personality Atom Araullo. She said that Atom's activism also came into him personally, during the protests against then-president Erap Estrada.

References 

Filipino activists
Living people
Year of birth missing (living people)